Molefe is a surname. Notable people with the surname include: 

Brian Molefe, South African businessman and politician
California Molefe (born 1980), Botswanan runner
Kgaudisa Molefe (born 2000), South African cricketer
Matee Molefe, South African sailor
Popo Molefe (born 1952), South African politician
Thabang Molefe (born 1979), South African football player

Given name
Molefe Lekoekoe, Lesothan football player
Molefe Pheto (born 1935), South African musician
Surnames of Botswana